(born ; 22 October 1939) is a television, film and stage actor from Kurobe, Toyama, Japan, widely known for his portrayal of Shin Hayata, the first Ultraman in the titular character series, a role he has played since the original series in 1966 and many other times during the franchise. In 2005, he played chief Kenzo Tomioka in Ultraman Max.

He made his film debut with Akatsukino Gasho in 1963. After appearing Ultraman he turned into a villain actor and appeared in many jidaigeki dramas. His daughter, Takami Yoshimoto, is also an actress, who portrayed Rena Yanase in Ultraman Tiga (1996).

Filmography

Films

1963: Akatsuki no gasshô
1964: Kokusai himitsu keisatsu: Tora no kiba as Sabato
1964: Hadaka no jûyaku as Kajimoto
1964: Ghidorah, the Three-Headed Monster as Moustachoied Assassin
1965: None but the Brave as Private Goro
1965: Taiheiyô kiseki no sakusen: Kisuka as Kato
1965: Kemonomichi
1965: Kokusai himitsu keisatsu: Kagi no kagi (Used to make What's Up, Tiger Lily?) as He-Qing Cai
1965: Hyappatsu hyakuchu as Man of sunglasses
1966: Abare Gôemon as Jyuro Kamiho
1966: Kiganjô no bôken as Military Leader
1966: What's Up, Tiger Lily? as He-Qing Cai (archive footage)
1967: King Kong Escapes as Henchman #3
1967: Son of Godzilla as Navigator
1968: Ultraman as Shin Hayata / Ultraman
1968: Kill! as Kinsaburo Ayuzawa
1968: Destroy All Monsters as Kilaak Controlled Staffer #3
1968: Isoroku as Army staff officer #2
1969: Goyôkin as Omura Sobee
1969: Latitude Zero as Chen
1975: The Bullet Train as Goto
1976: Zoku ningen kakumei
1979: Ultraman: Great Monster Decisive Battle as Shin Hayata / Ultraman
1979: Ultraman Kaijuu Daikessen as Shin Hayata / Ultraman
1990: Ultra Q the Movie: Hoshi no densetsu as Shin Hayata / Ultraman
1991: Godzilla vs. King Ghidorah as Fuyuki Takaoka
1992: Godzilla vs. Mothra as Fuyuki Takaoka
1993: Godzilla vs. Mechagodzilla II as Fuyuki Takaoka
1996: Revive! Ultraman as Shin Hayata / Ultraman (archive footage)
1997: Ultraman Zearth 2: Choujin Taisen Hikari to Yami as Night Watchman (Cameo)
1997: Ultraman Zearth 2 as Shin Hayata / Ultraman
2000: Godzilla vs. Megaguirus as Fuyuki Takaoka
2001: Ultraman Cosmos: The First Contact as Police Officer (cameo)
2003: Round 1
2005: Deep Sea Beast Reigo as Captain Yamagami
2006: Ultraman Mebius & Ultraman Brothers as Shin Hayata / Ultraman
2008: The Monster X Strikes Back/Attack the G8 Summit 
2008: Superior Ultraman 8 Brothers as Shin Hayata / Ultraman
2009: Mega Monster Battle: Ultra Galaxy as Shin Hayata / Ultraman
2010: Ultraman Zero: The Revenge of Belial as Shin Hayata / Ultraman (voice)
2011: Hômukamingu as Tsutomu Ishida
2012: Ultraman Saga as Shin Hayata / Ultraman
2013: Zeusu no houtei
2014: Genge

Television
1966: Ultra Q (Episode 8) as Shigeo Kimura
1966–1967: Ultraman as Shin Hayata
1970: Moeyo Ken as Nagakura Shinpachi
1971-1984: Ōedo Sōsamō (episodes 6, 74, 184, 210, 309, 396, 418, 452, 533, 572, 586, 616, and 631)
1971: The Return of Ultraman (Episode 38) as Shin Hayata / Ultraman
1972: Ronin of the Wilderness (episodes 27, 61)
1973: Robotto Keiji (Episode 23) as X-3
1973-79: Taiyō ni Hoero! (episodes 61, 123, 167, and 347)
The Water Margin (1973)
1973: Ultraman Taro (Episodes 33 & 34) as Shin Hayata / Ultraman
1974: Ultraman Leo (Episode 30) as Shinji Ookuma
1976-2007: Mito Kōmon 
1976: Space Ironman Kyodain (Episode 27) as Doctor
1977: Shin Hissatsu Shiokinin (Episode 40) as Sanji
1977: J.A.K.Q. Dengekitai (Episode 12) as Crime Boss
1978: Hissatsu Karakurinin Fugakuhyakkei Koroshitabi (Episode 4)
1979: Megaloman as Berlock
1981-82: Seibu Keisatsu (Episode102, 125)
1982: Uchuu Keiji Gavan (Episode 7) as Satohara / Doubleman
1985: Sukeban Deka (Episode 4)
1987–1988: Kamen Rider Black (Episodes 2–4, 10, 14 and 19) as Dr. Hidetomi Kuromatsu
1990–1991: Tokkei Winspector (Episodes 1, 48 & 49) as Dr. Onikichi Kuroda
1992: Tokusou Exceedraft (Episodes 45) as Harada
1993: Yugen Jikkou Sisters Chouchoutrian (Episode 40) as Shin Hayata
1993: Gridman the Hyper Agent (Episode 4) as Hosono
2003: Kokoro as Tatsuzo Murakami
2005–2006: Ultraman Max as Kenzou Tomioka
2007: Ultraman Mebius (Episodes 47 & 50) as Shin Hayata / Ultraman
2007: Mito Kōmon
2017: Samurai Gourmet (Episode 10) as Refined Gentleman / White Knight

References

External links
 

1939 births
Living people
Japanese male film actors
Japanese male television actors
Japanese male voice actors
Actors from Toyama Prefecture
Male voice actors from Toyama Prefecture
Chuo University alumni